Riccardo Innocenti (born 29 July 1943 in Ardenno) is an Italian former footballer. He had played 47 times (11 goals) in Serie A and 314 times (57 goals) in Serie B as a midfielder.

See also
Football in Italy

References

External links
 

Italian footballers
Association football midfielders
Serie A players
Serie B players
1943 births
Living people
Sportspeople from the Province of Sondrio
Footballers from Lombardy